Jakub Arak (born 2 April 1995) is a Polish professional footballer who plays as a striker for GKS Katowice.

Honours
Lechia Gdańsk
Polish Cup: 2018–19

Raków Częstochowa
Polish Cup: 2020–21, 2021–22
 Polish Super Cup: 2021

References

External links

Living people
1995 births
Association football forwards
Polish footballers
Legia Warsaw II players
Zagłębie Sosnowiec players
Ruch Chorzów players
Lechia Gdańsk players
Lechia Gdańsk II players
Raków Częstochowa players
GKS Katowice players
Ekstraklasa players
I liga players
III liga players
Footballers from Warsaw
Stal Mielec players
Poland youth international footballers